Ilyinsky (masculine), Ilyinskaya (feminine), or Ilyinskoye (neuter) is the name of several inhabited localities in Russia.

Altai Krai
As of 2010, one rural locality in Altai Krai bears this name:
Ilyinsky, Altai Krai, a settlement in Dolgovsky Selsoviet of Novichikhinsky District

Arkhangelsk Oblast
As of 2010, one rural locality in Arkhangelsk Oblast bears this name:
Ilyinskaya, Arkhangelsk Oblast, a village in Telegovsky Selsoviet of Krasnoborsky District

Republic of Bashkortostan
As of 2010, one rural locality in the Republic of Bashkortostan bears this name:
Ilyinsky, Republic of Bashkortostan, a village in Udelno-Duvaneysky Selsoviet of Blagoveshchensky District

Belgorod Oblast
As of 2010, one rural locality in Belgorod Oblast bears this name:
Ilyinsky, Belgorod Oblast, a khutor in Krasnogvardeysky District

Bryansk Oblast
As of 2010, one rural locality in Bryansk Oblast bears this name:
Ilyinsky, Bryansk Oblast, a settlement in Novopogoshchensky Selsoviet of Suzemsky District

Ivanovo Oblast
As of 2010, ten rural localities in Ivanovo Oblast bear this name:
Ilyinskoye (selo), Furmanovsky District, Ivanovo Oblast, a selo in Furmanovsky District
Ilyinskoye (village), Furmanovsky District, Ivanovo Oblast, a village in Furmanovsky District
Ilyinskoye, Kineshemsky District, Ivanovo Oblast, a selo in Kineshemsky District
Ilyinskoye, Lukhsky District, Ivanovo Oblast, a village in Lukhsky District
Ilyinskoye, Puchezhsky District, Ivanovo Oblast, a village in Puchezhsky District
Ilyinskoye, Shuysky District, Ivanovo Oblast, a selo in Shuysky District
Ilyinskoye, Teykovsky District, Ivanovo Oblast, a village in Teykovsky District
Ilyinskoye, Yuryevetsky District, Ivanovo Oblast, a selo in Yuryevetsky District
Ilyinskoye, Zavolzhsky District, Ivanovo Oblast, a village in Zavolzhsky District
Ilyinskaya, Ivanovo Oblast, a village in Savinsky District

Kaliningrad Oblast
As of 2010, one rural locality in Kaliningrad Oblast bears this name:
Ilyinskoye, Kaliningrad Oblast, a settlement in Chistoprudnensky Rural Okrug of Nesterovsky District

Kaluga Oblast
As of 2010, five rural localities in Kaluga Oblast bear this name:
Ilyinskoye, Kozelsky District, Kaluga Oblast, a selo in Kozelsky District
Ilyinskoye, Maloyaroslavetsky District, Kaluga Oblast, a selo in Maloyaroslavetsky District
Ilyinskoye, Peremyshlsky District, Kaluga Oblast, a selo in Peremyshlsky District
Ilyinskoye, Tarussky District, Kaluga Oblast, a village in Tarussky District
Ilyinskoye, Zhukovsky District, Kaluga Oblast, a selo in Zhukovsky District

Republic of Karelia
As of 2010, one rural locality in the Republic of Karelia bears this name:
Ilyinsky, Republic of Karelia, a settlement in Olonetsky District

Kirov Oblast
As of 2010, four rural localities in Kirov Oblast bear this name:
Ilyinskoye, Falyonsky District, Kirov Oblast, a selo in Petrunensky Rural Okrug of Falyonsky District
Ilyinskoye, Kirovo-Chepetsky District, Kirov Oblast, a selo in Prosnitsky Rural Okrug of Kirovo-Chepetsky District
Ilyinskoye, Nemsky District, Kirov Oblast, a selo in Ilyinsky Rural Okrug of Nemsky District
Ilyinskoye, Slobodskoy District, Kirov Oblast, a selo in Ilyinsky Rural Okrug of Slobodskoy District

Kostroma Oblast
As of 2010, eighteen rural localities in Kostroma Oblast bear this name:
Ilyinskoye, Antropovsky District, Kostroma Oblast, a village in Kotelnikovskoye Settlement of Antropovsky District
Ilyinskoye (selo), Tsentralnoye Settlement, Buysky District, Kostroma Oblast, a selo in Tsentralnoye Settlement of Buysky District
Ilyinskoye (village), Tsentralnoye Settlement, Buysky District, Kostroma Oblast, a village in Tsentralnoye Settlement of Buysky District
Ilyinskoye, Chukhlomsky District, Kostroma Oblast, a village in Shartanovskoye Settlement of Chukhlomsky District
Ilyinskoye, Galichsky District, Kostroma Oblast, a village in Dmitriyevskoye Settlement of Galichsky District
Ilyinskoye, Kadyysky District, Kostroma Oblast, a selo in Yekaterinkinskoye Settlement of Kadyysky District
Ilyinskoye, Kologrivsky District, Kostroma Oblast, a selo in Ilyinskoye Settlement of Kologrivsky District
Ilyinskoye, Apraksinskoye Settlement, Kostromskoy District, Kostroma Oblast, a village in Apraksinskoye Settlement of Kostromskoy District
Ilyinskoye, Samsonovskoye Settlement, Kostromskoy District, Kostroma Oblast, a selo in Samsonovskoye Settlement of Kostromskoy District
Ilyinskoye, Makaryevsky District, Kostroma Oblast, a village in Knyazhevskoye Settlement of Makaryevsky District
Ilyinskoye, Volzhskoye Settlement, Nerekhtsky District, Kostroma Oblast, a selo in Volzhskoye Settlement of Nerekhtsky District
Ilyinskoye, Voskresenskoye Settlement, Nerekhtsky District, Kostroma Oblast, a selo in Voskresenskoye Settlement of Nerekhtsky District
Ilyinskoye, Oktyabrsky District, Kostroma Oblast, a selo in Starikovskoye Settlement of Oktyabrsky District
Ilyinskoye, Parfenyevsky District, Kostroma Oblast, a selo in Matveyevskoye Settlement of Parfenyevsky District
Ilyinskoye, Pyshchugsky District, Kostroma Oblast, a selo in Golovinskoye Settlement of Pyshchugsky District
Ilyinskoye, Soligalichsky District, Kostroma Oblast, a village in Kortsovskoye Settlement of Soligalichsky District
Ilyinskoye, Sudislavsky District, Kostroma Oblast, a village in Raslovskoye Settlement of Sudislavsky District
Ilyinskoye, Susaninsky District, Kostroma Oblast, a selo in Buyakovskoye Settlement of Susaninsky District

Krasnodar Krai
As of 2010, two rural localities in Krasnodar Krai bear this name:
Ilyinskoye, Krasnodar Krai, a selo in Ilyinsky Rural Okrug of Kushchyovsky District
Ilyinskaya, Krasnodar Krai, a stanitsa in Ilyinsky Rural Okrug of Novopokrovsky District

Kurgan Oblast
As of 2010, one rural locality in Kurgan Oblast bears this name:
Ilyinskoye, Kurgan Oblast, a selo in Ilyinsky Selsoviet of Kataysky District

Kursk Oblast
As of 2010, one rural locality in Kursk Oblast bears this name:
Ilyinsky, Kursk Oblast, a settlement in Volkovsky Selsoviet of Zheleznogorsky District

Leningrad Oblast
As of 2010, one rural locality in Leningrad Oblast bears this name:
Ilyinskaya, Leningrad Oblast, a village in Vinnitskoye Settlement Municipal Formation of Podporozhsky District

Mari El Republic
As of 2010, two rural localities in the Mari El Republic bear this name:
Ilyinsky, Morkinsky District, Mari El Republic, a pochinok in Korkatovsky Rural Okrug of Morkinsky District
Ilyinsky, Sovetsky District, Mari El Republic, a pochinok in Alekseyevsky Rural Okrug of Sovetsky District

Moscow Oblast
As of 2010, thirteen inhabited localities in Moscow Oblast bear this name.

Urban localities
Ilyinsky, Moscow Oblast, a work settlement in Ramensky District

Rural localities
Ilyinskoye (selo), Domodedovo, Moscow Oblast, a selo under the administrative jurisdiction of the Domodedovo City Under Oblast Jurisdiction
Ilyinskoye (village), Domodedovo, Moscow Oblast, a village under the administrative jurisdiction of the Domodedovo City Under Oblast Jurisdiction
Ilyinskoye, Dmitrovsky District, Moscow Oblast, a selo under the administrative jurisdiction of the Town of Dmitrov in Dmitrovsky District
Ilyinskoye, Kolomensky District, Moscow Oblast, a village in Biorkovskoye Rural Settlement of Kolomensky District
Ilyinskoye, Krasnogorsky District, Moscow Oblast, a selo in Ilyinskoye Rural Settlement of Krasnogorsky District
Ilyinskoye, Lotoshinsky District, Moscow Oblast, a village in Mikulinskoye Rural Settlement of Lotoshinsky District
Ilyinskoye, Mozhaysky District, Moscow Oblast, a village in Zamoshinskoye Rural Settlement of Mozhaysky District
Ilyinskoye, Naro-Fominsky District, Moscow Oblast, a village in Veselevskoye Rural Settlement of Naro-Fominsky District
Ilyinskoye, Ramensky District, Moscow Oblast, a selo in Konstantinovskoye Rural Settlement of Ramensky District
Ilyinskoye, Ruzsky District, Moscow Oblast, a village in Volkovskoye Rural Settlement of Ruzsky District
Ilyinskoye, Teryayevskoye Rural Settlement, Volokolamsky District, Moscow Oblast, a selo in Teryayevskoye Rural Settlement of Volokolamsky District
Ilyinskoye, Yaropoletskoye Rural Settlement, Volokolamsky District, Moscow Oblast, a selo in Yaropoletskoye Rural Settlement of Volokolamsky District

Nizhny Novgorod Oblast
As of 2010, five rural localities in Nizhny Novgorod Oblast bear this name:
Ilyinsky, Nizhny Novgorod Oblast, a settlement in Nikolo-Pogostinsky Selsoviet of Gorodetsky District
Ilyinskoye, Bor, Nizhny Novgorod Oblast, a village in Krasnoslobodsky Selsoviet of the city of oblast significance of Bor
Ilyinskoye, Krasnobakovsky District, Nizhny Novgorod Oblast, a selo in Chashchikhinsky Selsoviet of Krasnobakovsky District
Ilyinskoye, Pochinkovsky District, Nizhny Novgorod Oblast, a selo in Uzhovsky Selsoviet of Pochinkovsky District
Ilyinskoye, Sokolsky District, Nizhny Novgorod Oblast, a village in Loyminsky Selsoviet of Sokolsky District

Novgorod Oblast
As of 2010, two rural localities in Novgorod Oblast bear this name:
Ilyinskoye, Krasnoborskoye Settlement, Kholmsky District, Novgorod Oblast, a village in Krasnoborskoye Settlement of Kholmsky District
Ilyinskoye, Togodskoye Settlement, Kholmsky District, Novgorod Oblast, a village in Togodskoye Settlement of Kholmsky District

Oryol Oblast
As of 2010, three rural localities in Oryol Oblast bear this name:
Ilyinsky, Oryol Oblast, a settlement in Studenovsky Selsoviet of Khotynetsky District
Ilyinskoye, Glazunovsky District, Oryol Oblast, a village in Ochkinsky Selsoviet of Glazunovsky District
Ilyinskoye, Khotynetsky District, Oryol Oblast, a selo in Ilyinsky Selsoviet of Khotynetsky District

Perm Krai
As of 2010, one rural locality in Perm Krai bears this name:
Ilyinsky, Perm Krai, a settlement in Ilyinsky District

Pskov Oblast
As of 2010, one rural locality in Pskov Oblast bears this name:
Ilyinskoye, Pskov Oblast, a village in Krasnogorodsky District

Rostov Oblast
As of 2010, one rural locality in Rostov Oblast bears this name:
Ilyinsky, Rostov Oblast, a khutor in Ilyinskoye Rural Settlement of Yegorlyksky District

Ryazan Oblast
As of 2010, one rural locality in Ryazan Oblast bears this name:
Ilyinskoye, Ryazan Oblast, a selo in Kozlovsky Rural Okrug of Rybnovsky District

Sakhalin Oblast
As of 2010, one rural locality in Sakhalin Oblast bears this name:
Ilyinskoye, Sakhalin Oblast, a selo in Tomarinsky District

Samara Oblast
As of 2010, one rural locality in Samara Oblast bears this name:
Ilyinsky, Samara Oblast, a settlement in Isaklinsky District

Sverdlovsk Oblast
As of 2010, one rural locality in Sverdlovsk Oblast bears this name:
Ilyinskoye, Sverdlovsk Oblast, a selo in Bogdanovichsky District

Republic of Tatarstan
As of 2010, three rural localities in the Republic of Tatarstan bear this name:
Ilyinsky, Republic of Tatarstan, a settlement in Pestrechinsky District
Ilyinskoye, Tetyushsky District, Republic of Tatarstan, a village in Tetyushsky District
Ilyinskoye, Zelenodolsky District, Republic of Tatarstan, a selo in Zelenodolsky District

Tula Oblast
As of 2010, one rural locality in Tula Oblast bears this name:
Ilyinskoye, Tula Oblast, a village in Zhemchuzhnikovskaya Rural Administration of Odoyevsky District

Tver Oblast
As of 2010, ten rural localities in Tver Oblast bear this name:
Ilyinskoye, Kalininsky District, Tver Oblast, a selo in Kalininsky District
Ilyinskoye, Kashinsky District, Tver Oblast, a village in Kashinsky District
Ilyinskoye, Kesovogorsky District, Tver Oblast, a village in Kesovogorsky District
Ilyinskoye, Kimrsky District, Tver Oblast, a selo in Kimrsky District
Ilyinskoye, Likhoslavlsky District, Tver Oblast, a selo in Likhoslavlsky District
Ilyinskoye, Staritsky District, Tver Oblast, a village in Staritsky District
Ilyinskoye (Romanovskoye Rural Settlement), Vesyegonsky District, Tver Oblast, a village in Vesyegonsky District; municipally, a part of Romanovskoye Rural Settlement of that district
Ilyinskoye (Kesemskoye Rural Settlement), Vesyegonsky District, Tver Oblast, a village in Vesyegonsky District; municipally, a part of Kesemskoye Rural Settlement of that district
Ilyinskoye, Vyshnevolotsky District, Tver Oblast, a village in Vyshnevolotsky District
Ilyinskoye, Zapadnodvinsky District, Tver Oblast, a village in Zapadnodvinsky District

Udmurt Republic
As of 2010, three rural localities in the Udmurt Republic bear this name:
Ilyinskoye, Alnashsky District, Udmurt Republic, a village in Staroutchansky Selsoviet of Alnashsky District
Ilyinskoye, Malopurginsky District, Udmurt Republic, a selo in Ilyinsky Selsoviet of Malopurginsky District
Ilyinskoye, Votkinsky District, Udmurt Republic, a village in Bolshekivarsky Selsoviet of Votkinsky District

Vladimir Oblast
As of 2010, four rural localities in Vladimir Oblast bear this name:
Ilyinskoye, Kirzhachsky District, Vladimir Oblast, a village in Kirzhachsky District
Ilyinskoye, Kolchuginsky District, Vladimir Oblast, a selo in Kolchuginsky District
Ilyinskoye, Selivanovsky District, Vladimir Oblast, a selo in Selivanovsky District
Ilyinskoye, Yuryev-Polsky District, Vladimir Oblast, a selo in Yuryev-Polsky District

Vologda Oblast
As of 2010, twelve rural localities in Vologda Oblast bear this name:
Ilyinskoye, Domozerovsky Selsoviet, Cherepovetsky District, Vologda Oblast, a selo in Domozerovsky Selsoviet of Cherepovetsky District
Ilyinskoye, Ilyinsky Selsoviet, Cherepovetsky District, Vologda Oblast, a selo in Ilyinsky Selsoviet of Cherepovetsky District
Ilyinskoye, Gryazovetsky District, Vologda Oblast, a village in Sidorovsky Selsoviet of Gryazovetsky District
Ilyinskoye, Nikolsky District, Vologda Oblast, a village in Argunovsky Selsoviet of Nikolsky District
Ilyinskoye, Sheksninsky District, Vologda Oblast, a village in Churovsky Selsoviet of Sheksninsky District
Ilyinskoye, Vashkinsky District, Vologda Oblast, a village in Roksomsky Selsoviet of Vashkinsky District
Ilyinskoye, Velikoustyugsky District, Vologda Oblast, a selo in Pokrovsky Selsoviet of Velikoustyugsky District
Ilyinskoye, Oktyabrsky Selsoviet, Vologodsky District, Vologda Oblast, a village in Oktyabrsky Selsoviet of Vologodsky District
Ilyinskoye, Raboche-Krestyansky Selsoviet, Vologodsky District, Vologda Oblast, a village in Raboche-Krestyansky Selsoviet of Vologodsky District
Ilyinskoye, Spassky Selsoviet, Vologodsky District, Vologda Oblast, a village in Spassky Selsoviet of Vologodsky District
Ilyinskaya, Tarnogsky District, Vologda Oblast, a village in Nizhnespassky Selsoviet of Tarnogsky District
Ilyinskaya, Velikoustyugsky District, Vologda Oblast, a village in Yudinsky Selsoviet of Velikoustyugsky District

Yaroslavl Oblast
As of 2010, twenty-two rural localities in Yaroslavl Oblast bear this name:
Ilyinskoye, Bolsheselsky District, Yaroslavl Oblast, a village in Chudinovsky Rural Okrug of Bolsheselsky District
Ilyinskoye, Borisoglebsky District, Yaroslavl Oblast, a selo in Krasnooktyabrsky Rural Okrug of Borisoglebsky District
Ilyinskoye, Gorinsky Rural Okrug, Danilovsky District, Yaroslavl Oblast, a village in Gorinsky Rural Okrug of Danilovsky District
Ilyinskoye, Semlovsky Rural Okrug, Danilovsky District, Yaroslavl Oblast, a village in Semlovsky Rural Okrug of Danilovsky District
Ilyinskoye, Trofimovsky Rural Okrug, Danilovsky District, Yaroslavl Oblast, a village in Trofimovsky Rural Okrug of Danilovsky District
Ilyinskoye, Nekouzsky Rural Okrug, Nekouzsky District, Yaroslavl Oblast, a village in Nekouzsky Rural Okrug of Nekouzsky District
Ilyinskoye, Shestikhinsky Rural Okrug, Nekouzsky District, Yaroslavl Oblast, a village in Shestikhinsky Rural Okrug of Nekouzsky District
Ilyinskoye, Nekrasovsky District, Yaroslavl Oblast, a selo in Grebovsky Rural Okrug of Nekrasovsky District
Ilyinskoye, Pereslavsky District, Yaroslavl Oblast, a selo in Glebovsky Rural Okrug of Pereslavsky District
Ilyinskoye, Nikologorsky Rural Okrug, Pervomaysky District, Yaroslavl Oblast, a village in Nikologorsky Rural Okrug of Pervomaysky District
Ilyinskoye, Prechistensky Rural Okrug, Pervomaysky District, Yaroslavl Oblast, a selo in Prechistensky Rural Okrug of Pervomaysky District
Ilyinskoye, Beloselsky Rural Okrug, Poshekhonsky District, Yaroslavl Oblast, a selo in Beloselsky Rural Okrug of Poshekhonsky District
Ilyinskoye, Leninsky Rural Okrug, Poshekhonsky District, Yaroslavl Oblast, a village in Leninsky Rural Okrug of Poshekhonsky District
Ilyinskoye, Voshchikovsky Rural Okrug, Poshekhonsky District, Yaroslavl Oblast, a village in Voshchikovsky Rural Okrug of Poshekhonsky District
Ilyinskoye, Lomovsky Rural Okrug, Rybinsky District, Yaroslavl Oblast, a village in Lomovsky Rural Okrug of Rybinsky District
Ilyinskoye, Oktyabrsky Rural Okrug, Rybinsky District, Yaroslavl Oblast, a village in Oktyabrsky Rural Okrug of Rybinsky District
Ilyinskoye, Artemyevsky Rural Okrug, Tutayevsky District, Yaroslavl Oblast, a village in Artemyevsky Rural Okrug of Tutayevsky District
Ilyinskoye, Rodionovsky Rural Okrug, Tutayevsky District, Yaroslavl Oblast, a selo in Rodionovsky Rural Okrug of Tutayevsky District
Ilyinskoye, Ilyinsky Rural Okrug, Uglichsky District, Yaroslavl Oblast, a selo in Ilyinsky Rural Okrug of Uglichsky District
Ilyinskoye, Klimatinsky Rural Okrug, Uglichsky District, Yaroslavl Oblast, a village in Klimatinsky Rural Okrug of Uglichsky District
Ilyinskoye, Pestretsovsky Rural Okrug, Yaroslavsky District, Yaroslavl Oblast, a village in Pestretsovsky Rural Okrug of Yaroslavsky District
Ilyinskoye, Tochishchensky Rural Okrug, Yaroslavsky District, Yaroslavl Oblast, a village in Tochishchensky Rural Okrug of Yaroslavsky District

See also
Khutor Ilyinsky, a village in Orlovsky District of Oryol Oblast
sovkhoza "Ilyinsky", a settlement in Olonetsky District of the Republic of Karelia, Russia
Ilya (disambiguation)
Ilyin
Ilyino
Ilyinka